Neil Park was a baseball park in Columbus, Ohio.

It was the home field of several Columbus professional baseball teams, notably the Columbus Senators, from 1900 until it was abandoned in mid-season 1932 with the opening of Red Bird stadium and later demolished in 1937.

It is sometimes referred to as "Neil Park I" and "Neil Park II" by historians. Its first incarnation had the diamond in the southeast corner. The park was rebuilt in 1905 and became the first ballpark in the country to use concrete and steel construction. During this reconstruction the diamond was reoriented in the southwest corner.

Its location was listed in Drehers Simplex Street and House Number Guide, Columbus, Ohio, 1929 -1930 as 475 Cleveland Ave. Other early city directories listed it as "west side Cleveland Avenue north of Buckingham Street." and "west side Cleveland Avenue opposite Fort Hayes." The site is now occupied by one of several locations of Abbott Laboratories and Abbott Nutrition.

External links 
Diagram of Neil Park from the 1921 Sanborn Fire Insurance Map
Another version from 1921 Sanborn map

Sports venues in Columbus, Ohio
Downtown Columbus, Ohio